Appenheim is an Ortsgemeinde – a municipality belonging to a Verbandsgemeinde, a kind of collective municipality – in the Mainz-Bingen district in Rhineland-Palatinate, Germany.

Geography

Location 
The municipality lies southwest of Mainz and is an agricultural community. The winegrowing centre belongs to the Verbandsgemeinde of Gau-Algesheim, whose seat is in the like-named town. Through the municipal area flow both the rivers Welzbach and Wethbach.

History 
In 882, Appenheim had its first documentary mention in the Prüm Abbey’s “Golden Book”.

Politics

Municipal council 
The council is made up of 17 council members, counting the part-time mayor, with seats apportioned thus:

Elections in 2014:

CDU: 7 seats
SPD: 7 seats
FDP: 2 seats

Town partnerships 
 Apfelstädt, Gotha district, Thuringia
 Marano di Valpolicella, Province of Verona, Veneto, Italy

Culture and sightseeing

Regular events 
The Appenheim kermis (church consecration festival, locally known as the Kerb) is always held in early June.

Economy and infrastructure

Transport 
The municipality is crossed by Landesstraße (state road) 415. The Autobahnen A 60 and A 63 can be reached by car in ten to twenty minutes.

Education 
There are a municipal kindergarten and a primary school, Grundschule Welzbachtal.

Curiosities 

The Appenheimer Hundertgulden vineyard on the slopes of the Westerberg is the vineyard with the highest carbonate content of all in Germany. From this come wines with a fruity sourness at high pH levels which are quite mineral-laden but nevertheless very salubrious.

Famous people

Sons and daughters of the town 
Johann Horn (d. 1800), Palatine-Bavarian sergeant, Knight of the Bavarian Medal of Bravery
Johann Konrad Schiede (b. about 1760 in Kassel; d. 19 September 1826 in Appenheim), was a clergyman, a participant in the Late Age of Enlightenment and an author of cheap novels.
Esther Knewitz, Rheinhessen Wine Queen 2001–2002, German Wine Princess 2003-2004

References

External links 

 Municipality’s official webpage 

Municipalities in Rhineland-Palatinate
Rhenish Hesse
Mainz-Bingen